Kheyrabad-e Sofla (also Romanized as Kheyrābād-e Soflá; also known as Nāzbānū) is a village in Teshkan Rural District, Chegeni District, Dowreh County, Lorestan Province, Iran. At the 2006 census, its population was 129, in 27 families.

References 

Towns and villages in Dowreh County